Alexis Arquette (born Robert Arquette; July 28, 1969 – September 11, 2016) was an American actress.

Early life
Arquette was born in Los Angeles, the fourth of five children of Lewis Arquette, an actor and director, and Brenda Olivia "Mardi" (née Nowak), a Jewish actress, poet, theater operator, activist, acting teacher, and therapist. Lewis's family's surname was originally "Arcouet"; Lewis's father was comedian Cliff Arquette, who went by the stage name of Charley Weaver. Arquette was distantly related to American explorer Meriwether Lewis. Actors Rosanna, Richmond, Patricia, and David Arquette are her siblings.

Career
In 1982, at the age of 12, Arquette's first acting gig was as "this little kid who's on a ride with all these women and whatnot" in the music video "She's a Beauty" by The Tubes. In 1986, Arquette made her big screen debut in an uncredited role as Alexis, the androgynous friend and bandmate of sexually ambivalent teenager Max Whiteman (Evan Richards) in Down and Out in Beverly Hills.

Arquette, in the earlier years of her career, primarily performed as a female impersonator, frequently under the name "Eva Destruction". Later in her career, Arquette made public that she had begun the process leading to sex reassignment surgery. To this end, Arquette had publicly declared that she considered her gender to be female.

At 19, Arquette played trans sex worker Georgette in the screen adaptation of Last Exit to Brooklyn. The majority of Arquette's film work was in low-budget or independent films. In total, Arquette starred in more than 40 movies, including I Think I Do, Children of the Corn V: Fields of Terror, and Sometimes They Come Back... Again. Arquette also starred as a crack addict opposite Tim Roth in Jumpin' at the Boneyard, as a teenage boy seeking revenge for a horrible childhood in the New Zealand-shot horror fantasy Jack Be Nimble, and as a murderous drag queen in the low budget comedy Killer Drag Queens on Dope.

Arquette also had supporting roles in Pulp Fiction, Threesome and Bride of Chucky, and she played a Boy George fanatic, George Stitzer, in the Adam Sandler–Drew Barrymore film The Wedding Singer, singing "Do You Really Want to Hurt Me" over and over. Her role as Georgina, a Boy George impersonator, in another Sandler–Barrymore film, Blended, was a reference to that role. In 2001, Arquette returned to New Zealand to play Roman emperor Caligula in two episodes of Xena: Warrior Princess. That same year, Arquette guest starred in the Friends episode "The One with Chandler's Dad", in which she directly interacted with her sister-in-law, Courteney Cox. Also in the same year, she cameoed in Son of the Beach.

In September 2005, VH1 announced Arquette as one of the celebrity house-guests on the 6th season of The Surreal Life. On January 31, 2007, Arquette was a featured celebrity client and guest judge on the première episode of Bravo's reality show Top Design. Arquette also made a cameo appearance in the music video for Robbie Williams' song "She's Madonna".

Personal life and death
In 2004, Arquette expressed an interest in undergoing gender-transitioning medical treatment. She decided against undergoing hormone therapy, and kept her choice of whether she underwent gender-affirming surgery private from the media by the time she completed her transition in 2006. Her experience was documented in the film Alexis Arquette: She's My Brother, which debuted at the 2007 Tribeca Film Festival. Arquette was a vocal supporter of other transgender people, including Chaz Bono, who transitioned shortly after Arquette.

Arquette contracted HIV in 1987. In later life, Arquette suffered from ill health as a result of being HIV-positive. Amid these increasing complications, Alexis began presenting again as a man in 2013. Brother David Arquette said that Alexis was "gender suspicious", and alternately felt like a man or a woman at different times.
Arquette was placed in a medically induced coma and died on September 11, 2016, surrounded by close family, at the age of 47. Arquette was serenaded with David Bowie's "Starman". The official cause of death was cardiac arrest caused by myocarditis stemming from HIV.

Filmography

Television

Awards and nominations

References

External links

 
 

1969 births
2016 deaths
20th-century American actresses
21st-century American actresses
Actresses from Los Angeles
AIDS-related deaths in California
Deaths from myocarditis
American drag queens
American film actresses
American people of Polish-Jewish descent
American people of Russian-Jewish descent
American television actresses
American Ashkenazi Jews
Arquette family
American LGBT musicians
LGBT people from California
American LGBT rights activists
Transgender actresses
Transgender musicians
Transgender Jews
Activists from California
Transgender drag performers
American LGBT actors
Genderfluid people
Non-binary drag performers